The 2001 season was the tenth full year of competitive football (soccer) in Estonia since gaining independence from the Soviet Union in 1991-08-20.

National Leagues

Meistriliiga

Esiliiga

Estonian FA Cup

Final

National team

References

External links
2001 season on RSSSF
RSSSF Historic Results
RSSSF National Team Results

 
Seasons in Estonian football